Der Bergdoktor is a remake of the 1990s German-Austrian medical drama television series Der Bergdoktor, broadcast since 6 February 2008.

Cast and characters
 Hans Sigl as Dr. Martin Gruber
 Heiko Ruprecht as Hans Gruber
 Ronja Forcher as Lilli Gruber
 Natalie O'Hara as Susanne Dreiseitl
 Mark Keller as Dr. Alexander Kahnweiler
 Monika Baumgartner as Elisabeth Gruber
 Rebecca Immanuel as Dr. Vera Fendrich
 Simone Hanselmann as Franziska Hochstetter

See also
 List of German television series

References

External links
 
 Der Bergdoktor on ZDF

German drama television series
2008 German television series debuts
German medical television series
Austrian medical television series
Television shows set in Austria
2010s German television series
German-language television shows
Television shows based on German novels
ZDF original programming
ORF (broadcaster) original programming